Murero is a municipality in Zaragoza province.

References

Municipalities in the Province of Zaragoza